Prince Friedrich Karl of Prussia  may refer to:
Prince Friedrich Karl of Prussia (1828-1885)
Prince Friedrich Karl of Prussia (1893–1917)